is a Japanese voice actor and singer previously affiliated with Space Craft Group. He became a freelancer in August 2018. He joined the record label Toy's Factory in November 2018 as a voice actor and solo singer.

Biography
Masuda was born on March 8, 1990, in Kure, Hiroshima. His family consists of his father, mother, and a younger brother. He was interested in acting from a very young age and wanted to become a voice actor during high school after watching the anime series Code Geass and Gurren Lagann, the last of which piqued his interest in that area. In 2008, he moved to Tokyo and entered the broadcasting department of the Tokyo Announce Gakuin Performing Arts College.

In 2009, he auditioned for Musical: The Prince of Tennis and was selected for the role of Seiichi Yukimura, this being his debut role. In September 2010, Masuda decided to stop pursuing theater for a while and focus on voice acting, so he was transferred to the voice actors division of his former agency, Space Craft. He began his activities as a voice actor in October, being an assistant on the radio show A & G Artist Zone 2h. In April 2011, Masuda landed his first regular role in an anime series, Yu-Gi-Oh! Zexal, playing Ryōga Kamishiro.

In October 2011, Masuda and fellow voice actor Yoshimasa Hosoya starred in a radio show titled Hosoya Yoshimasa ・ Masuda Toshiki no Zenryoku Danshi, which ran until March 31, 2013. In February 2012, Masuda and Hosoya also formed a unit called "MaxBoys" and released a CD.

In 2013, he voiced the main character Masayoshi Hazama/Samurai Flamenco in the Samurai Flamenco series, while in 2014 he voiced Chikara Ennoshita in Haikyu!!. In 2015, he played Ryuu Zaō in Cute High Earth Defense Club Love! and in its subsequent sequel in 2016. In 2017, he landed the lead role of Masahiro Setagawa in Hitorijime My Hero.

Masuda became a freelancer in August 2018, after nine years under Space Craft. He joined record label Toy's Factory in November 2018 and on March 6, 2019, Masuda launched his debut extended play, This One. On January 8, 2020, he released his debut studio album, Diver. His second studio album, origin, was released on September 29, 2021.

Filmography

TV anime

Original video animation (OVA)

Original net animation (ONA)

Anime films

Video games

Dubbing

Live-action

Discography

Singles

EP (Extended Plays)

Albums

Character Song CDs
Marginal Number 4|MARGINAL#4 as Kirihara Atom
Tsukiuta. as Kisaragi Koi
Dear Vocalist - Hyacinth (2015) as RE-O-DO
B-Project - Glory Upper (2015) as Mikado Sekimura
B-Project - Brand New Star (2016) as Mikado Sekimura
B-Project - Kodō＊Ambitious (2016) as Mikado Sekimura
B-Project - Hoshi to Tsuki no Sentence (2016) as Mikado Sekimura
B-Project - B-Project: Kodō＊Ambitious Volume 2 (2016) as Mikado Sekimura
Dear Vocalist - Ambitious Night (2016) as RE-O-DO
B-Project - Muteki＊Dangerous (2016) as Mikado Sekimura
B-Project - SUMMER MERMAID (2017) as Mikado Sekimura
Dear Vocalist - Dear Vocalist THE BEST Rock Out!!! TYPE A (2017) as RE-O-DO
B-Project - S-Kyuu Paradise BLACK/WHITE (2017) as Mikado Sekimura
Dear Vocalist - iNiTiaTiVe (2017) as RE-O-DO
Dear Vocalist - EXiT (2018) as RE-O-DO
Dear Vocalist - Dear Vocalist THE BEST Rock Out!!! #2 TYPE A (2018) as RE-O-DO
Dear Vocalist - CHAMPION (2019) as RE-O-DO
Dear Vocalist - Dilemma (2021) as RE-O-DO

References

External links
 
 Toshiki Masuda - YouTube

1990 births
Living people
Japanese male pop singers
Japanese male musical theatre actors
Japanese male video game actors
Japanese male voice actors
Male voice actors from Hiroshima Prefecture
Japanese YouTubers
21st-century Japanese male actors
21st-century Japanese singers
21st-century Japanese male singers